TV Travel Shop was a British television channel that sold holidays.

It launched in April 1998, primarily on satellite and cable, broadcasting between 6am and 5pm, sharing space with Challenge. In 1999, the channel began broadcasting 24 hours a day.

In 2000, the channel launched on ONdigital, using capacity from ONrequest 2 (later ITV Select 2), and broadcast 6am-12pm weekdays, and 6am-10am weekends, free to air on channel 44. Its hours were extended in January 2002 to be broadcast from 6am-6pm daily. However, after the demise of ITV Digital, TV Travel Shop made a deal with the multiplex operator, SDN, to carry the channel 24 hours a day using the newly freed up capacity. It moved to channel 17 at the launch of Freeview.

However, by December 2003, Top Up TV were looking to buy slots for their new subscription platform, and acquired the slot and LCN occupied by TV Travel Shop. The channel went off air on 16 April 2004, and its stream was replaced in April 2004 by a Top Up TV subscription stream.

TV Travel Shop 2
From 2000, TV Travel Shop 2 was introduced broadcasting on cable and satellite, offering late bargains, new places and repeats of shows from TV Travel Shop. This was positioned next to TV Travel Shop on Sky Digital and NTL.

By late 2004, the channels were suffering from lack of customers and were scheduled for a shut down.

Previously, in 2003 TV Travel Shop was taken over by the IAC Corporation and all sales were moved to an Expedia call centre in Belfast, whilst the cruise department remained in Bromley until the channels were permanently closed in March 2005. They were replaced by auction channels iBuy and iBuy2 on Sky Digital.

Defunct television channels in the United Kingdom
Television channels and stations established in 1998
Television channels and stations disestablished in 2004
1998 establishments in the United Kingdom
2004 disestablishments in the United Kingdom